Valentino is a 1951 American biographical film directed by Lewis Allen and starring Eleanor Parker.

Plot
It is a romantic biopic of the actor Rodolfo Valentino, or "Rudolph Valentino" as he is better known, who arrives in the United States of America from Italy and soon becomes a movie star. 
He falls in love with an actress and dies at an early age.

Cast
 Eleanor Parker as Joan Carlise, also known as Sarah Gray
 Richard Carlson as Bill King
 Patricia Medina as Lila Reyes
 Joseph Calleia as Luigi Verducci
 Dona Drake as  Maria Torres
 Lloyd Gough as Eddie Morgan
 Otto Kruger as Mark Towers
 Anthony Dexter as Rudolph Valentino
 Charles Coleman as Albert (uncredited) 
 Eric Wilton as Butler (uncredited)

Production
Edward Small had announced the project in 1938, with Jack Dunn first mooted to play the title role as a follow up to his debut in The Duke of West Point. However the film had been delayed by script troubles, legal threats, the war, troubles making a movie with the lead character was Italian, and looking for the right actor to play the lead.

Scripting
Florence Ryan wrote a script in 1939, but this was often rewritten. Others who worked on it (there were an estimated over 30 drafts) include Edward Chodorov, Stephen Longstreet, Sheridan Gibney, Frederick J. Jackson, Virginia Van Upp and George Oppenheimer.
Eventual director Lewis Allen described the film as "an imaginary, romantic story with acting as a background." Edward Small could not get clearance from either of Valentino's wives, Jean Acker or Natacha Rambova so the script did not feature either; instead he has three fictitious lovers in the film, one of whom is his married co-star.

Casting
Del Casino and Louis Hayward were mentioned as early possibilities. In 1946 it was announced Small tried to secure Cornel Wilde for the lead but was unable to. Frederik Vayder auditioned and Louis Jourdan, Helmut Dantine and John Derek were also considered.

The final script was heavily fictionalised to avoid lawsuits from Valentino's former wives, industry associates and his family namely his brother Alberto.

Anthony Dexter was selected over 2,000 actors who auditioned. He was under contract to Small for two years taking acting and dancing lessons before being used in the film. Lewis Allen was hired from Paramount and was paid $60,000.

In 1949, another producer Jan Grippo announced plans to make a rival project but eventually came to an agreement with Small; Grippo became an associate on the film. (In the 1940s there was another proposed project starring Victor Mature and Pola Negri.)

Shooting
Filming started on 2 June 1950 and took place at the Columbia Ranch and the Sam Goldwyn Studios. George Melford, who directed Valentino in the 1920s, had a supporting role.

The film includes recreated sequences from such Valentino films as The Sheik (1921), Blood and Sand (1922), A Sainted Devil (1924) and The Eagle (1926).

Reception
Reviews were mostly poor.

The film was one of Edward Small's few box office failures. However it did well in South America where Anthony Dexter subsequently went on a dancing tour.

It was announced that Dexter would appear in a remake of The Sheik (1921), the rights for which Small had purchased in order to show segments of that film in Valentino. However he only made one more film for Small - The Brigand - then they terminated their contract by mutual agreement.

Alice Terry sued the filmmakers for $750,000 complaining she was depicted in the film as carrying out an illicit love affair while still being married. Valentino's brother and sister launched a $500,000 lawsuit against the filmmakers. Both cases settled out of court.

References

External links 

 
 

1951 films
1950s biographical drama films
American biographical drama films
Columbia Pictures films
1950s English-language films
Films about Rudolph Valentino
Films directed by Lewis Allen
Films produced by Edward Small
Films scored by Heinz Roemheld
Films set in the 1920s
1951 drama films
1950s American films